The 1970–71 Idaho Vandals men's basketball team represented the University of Idaho during the 1970–71 NCAA University Division basketball season. Charter members of the recently expanded Big Sky Conference, the Vandals were led by fifth-year head coach Wayne Anderson and played their home games on campus at the Memorial Gymnasium in Moscow, Idaho. They were 14–11 overall and 8–6 in conference play.

Senior forward Malcolm Taylor was selected for the all-conference team, and senior forward John Nelson was on the second team.

References

External links
Sports Reference – Idaho Vandals: 1970–71 basketball season
Idaho Argonaut – student newspaper – 1971 editions

Idaho Vandals men's basketball seasons
Idaho
Idaho
Idaho